New Carlisle may refer to:

Communities
New Carlisle, Indiana, United States
New Carlisle, Ohio, United States
New Carlisle, Quebec, Canada

Transportation
New Carlisle station (South Shore Line), a former railroad station in New Carlisle, Indiana, United States
New Carlisle station (Quebec), a former railway station in New Carlisle, Quebec, Canada